Tony Jones (born 15 April 1960) is an English former professional snooker player.

Career
In 1983, Jones became the English Amateur Champion, beating John Parrott 13–9. He was also a World Championship doubles finalist (with partner Ray Reardon) in 1985.

Jones was the surprise winner of the 1991 European Open when, ranked no. 35 in the world, he beat Mark Johnston-Allen 9–7, despite never having previously been beyond the quarter-final stage of a ranking tournament. He reached no. 15 in the 1991/1992 rankings as a result, but dropped out of the top sixteen the following season. Despite a quarter-final appearance at the 1996 Grand Prix, he gradually slid down the rankings and lost his professional status in 2004.

Performance and rankings timeline

Career finals

Ranking finals: 1 (1 title)

Team finals: 1

Amateur finals: 1 (1 title)

References

1960 births
Living people
English snooker players
Sportspeople from Blackpool